May Stevens (June 9, 1924 – December 9, 2019) was an American feminist artist, political activist, educator, and writer.

Early life and education
May Stevens was born in Boston to working-class parents, Alice Dick Stevens and Ralph Stanley Stevens, and grew up in Quincy, Massachusetts. She had one brother, Stacey Dick Stevens, who died of pneumonia at the age of fifteen. By Stevens's account, her father expressed his racism at home but "never said these things publicly, nor did he act on them—to my knowledge. But he said them over and over."

Stevens earned a B.F.A. at the Massachusetts College of Art (1946), and studied at the Académie Julian in Paris (1948) and Art Students League in New York City (1948). She was granted an MFA equivalency by the New York City Board of Education in 1960 and was a postdoctoral fellow at the Bunting Institute of Radcliffe College in 1988–89. In 1948 she married Rudolf Baranik (1920-1998), with whom she had one child.

Activism
Stevens was a founding member of the feminist group the Guerrilla Girls.

Work
Over the course of her career, Stevens tended to work in series.  Her body of work divides into several periods, each characterized by a particular theme or concern. She said that she "start[s] with an idea and I always have more to say about it." While her political commitment drove her earlier work, her later works tend to be lyrical.

Freedom Riders 

The first series influenced by her political awareness is a group of paintings called Freedom Riders exhibited in 1963 at the Roko Gallery in New York.   At her husband's request Martin Luther King, Jr. agreed to sign his name to the catalog's forward, in which the Freedom Riders' actions were praised as deserving mention in song and painting.  These are the first works by Stevens in which her political awareness influenced the subject of her paintings. Based on the Freedom Riders, civil rights activists who challenged segregation in the South through riding segregated buses and registering voters, Freedom Riders, a haunting black and white lithograph of individual portraits, was also the title of a work in this exhibition.  Although Stevens did not participate in their activities she strongly supported the  Civil rights movement, and had taken part in protests in Washington, DC. In another work in the exhibition, Honor Roll (1963),the names of James Meredith, Harvey Gantt, and five other African American men, women, and children who were active in attempts to integrate schools in the South are scratched on the surface as if they were listed on a school's honor roll for academic distinction, Most of Stevens's Freedom Riders paintings were based images in newspapers and on television.

Big Daddy 
Stevens created her Big Daddy series between 1967 and 1976, coinciding with the U.S. escalation of involvement in Vietnam.  The image of "Big Daddy" is based on a painting she made of her father watching television in his undershirt in 1967  Although the Big Daddy figure was initially inspired by Stevens' anger towards her father, whom she has characterized as an ordinary working-class man, with pro-war, pro-establishment, anti-Semitic, and profoundly racist attitudes, ultimately the figure became transmuted into a more universal symbol of patriarchal imperialism. In expansive, predominantly red, white and blue images that show the influence of Pop Art, she created a homogenized, phallic, ignorant, male persona that acted as a visual metaphor for all that she felt was hypocritical and unjust in the patriarchal power dynamics of family life. Stevens showed her metaphoric 'Big Daddy' in many guises. In Big Daddy Paper Doll (1970), he is centrally seated holding a pug dog on his lap, surrounded by an array of cut-out costumes:  an executioner, soldier, policeman, and butcher.  Although the bullet shaped head and bulldog on his lap exaggerate his potential violence and power, through the metaphor of the cut-out, Stevens contains his potency. In Pax Americana 1973, he sits helmet on head, pug dog on lap, as if clothed in the stars and stripes of the flag. Her work held a questioning mirror up to many Americans and what she considered to be their unconsidered positions on racial and sexually equality and foreign policy.

Feminist Historical Revisions 
During the early through mid 1970s, Stevens became increasingly involved in feminist political activities, making the connection between women's struggle against oppression and the civil rights and anti-war movements. As in her previous work, her political awareness was reflected in her art. After reading Linda Nochlin's essay "Why Have There Been No Great Women Artists?," Stevens became interested in Artemisia Gentileschi, and in 1976 she painted a nine-foot portrait of Artemisia Gentileschi for a feminist collaborative installation called The Sister Chapel. Between 1974 and 1981, Stevens created three large pictures that she called History Paintings. The series' title refers to the academic tradition of history painting but Stevens reconfigured art historical tropes from the perspective of her own life and other women artists to whom she was connected, drawing upon both her personal and political history In Artist's Studio (After Courbet), 1974 she placed herself in front of one of her Big Daddy paintings, in the pivotal position held by Courbet in his work, The Painter's Studio. Soho Women Artists (1977–78) is a group portrait of women in Stevens's political and artistic circle, including Lucy R. Lippard, Miriam Schapiro, Joyce Kozloff, and Harmony Hammond, who along with Stevens were among the founders of the Heresies Collective, which also, from 1977 to 1983, published the journal "Heresies: A feminist publication on arts and politics."  Mysteries and Politics (1978), is reminiscent of a sacred conversation, in this case between thirteen women who influenced Stevens in their efforts to integrate their feminist politics, creativity, and family life.

Ordinary/Extraordinary 
In her next series, Ordinary/Extraordinary, painted between 1976 and 1978, Stevens juxtaposed two women - Alice Stevens, her working-class, Irish Catholic mother and Rosa Luxembourg, the Polish Marxist philosopher and social activist, in order to compare, contrast, and ultimately find resonances between these two seemingly different women and their differing life paths - one private, in which her own interests were ignored, and the other public, yet whose powerful ideas and presence ultimately led to her destruction. Specifically, she wanted to "erode the polarized notion that one woman's life was special and the other forgettable." The figures had appeared together in two previous works, a collage originally published in Heresies, and in the painting Mysteries and Politics, discussed above. The works in this series are large and powerful.  In Go Gentle (1983) constructed through a cascade of photographs, Stevens in her presentation of her mother who seems to press against the plane of the canvas, echoes but contradicts Dylan Thomas' wish for his father to "not go gentle into that good night." Alice alone is the subject of the monumental five-paneled Alice in the Garden, where she holds a bunch of dandelions, which Stevens' describes having thrown at her when she visited her mother at the nursing home where she spent her last years.

Later works: Sea of Words, Bodies of Water 
Water was an important element of Stevens last two series, Sea of Words (begun in 1990), and Rivers and Other Bodies of Water (begun in 2001).  By the 1990s, Stevens began to use words in her works; as she said, "words are everywhere." In the painting Sea of Words (1990–91), four luminous, wraithlike boats float on a glimmering "sea" constructed through semi-readable lines of flowing words, taken from the writings of both Virginia Woolf and Julia Kristeva. In her later works water itself became a major theme, as in Three Boats On a Green Sea (1999).  Throughout her life water was special and evocative to her - she has written of the experience of swimming as a child and also the poem "Standing in A River" as an adult, in which she describes minnows swimming around her legs. The water is also a way of expressing grief for her lost loved ones, whose ashes she scattered in rivers, her son, her mother, and her husband.

Exhibitions and recognition
In 1999, the Museum of Fine Arts, Boston, had a major retrospective of her work, entitled Images of Women Near and Far 1983-1997, the museum's first exhibition for a living female artist. 

One of Stevens' Freedom Riders series was selected to illustrate the 1961 Freedom Riders in a 2005 panel of United States postage stamps called, "To Form a More Perfect Union." The panel of 37 cent stamps commemorated ten major milestones of the Civil Rights Movement with artwork from different artists. 

Her solo exhibition in 2006 at the Minneapolis Institute of Art traveled to Springfield Museum of Art, MO and National Museum of Women in the Arts, Washington, DC.  Stevens’ work is in numerous museum collections, including the British Museum, the Brooklyn Museum,  the Cleveland Museum,  The Fogg Art Museum, the Metropolitan Museum of Art, the Museum of Fine Arts, Boston, The Museum of Modern Art, NY, National Academy of Design, NY, National Museum of Women in the Arts, San Francisco Museum of Modern Art, and Whitney Museum of American Art. Stevens' work was included in the 2022 exhibition Women Painting Women at the Modern Art Museum of Fort Worth.

References

Selected bibliography
Alloway, Lawrence. May Stevens. Catalog for Big Daddy Series. New York: Herbert F Johnson Museum of Art, Cornell University, 1973.
Braff, Phyllis. “The Feminine Image in Its Many Facets in the 20th Century.” New York Times, April 6, 1997.
Chadwick, Whitney. Women, Art and Society. London: Thames and Hudson, 1991.
Glueck, Grace. “May Stevens ‘Rivers and Other Bodies of Water’”. New York Times. June 1, 2001.
Gouma-Peterson, Thalia and Patricia Mathews. “The Feminist Critique of Art History.” Art Bulletin, September 1987.
Hills, Patricia, ed. May Stevens. Ordinary/Extraordinary: A Summation, 1977-1984. Essays by Donald Kuspit, Lucy Lippard, Moira Roth, Lisa Tickner. Boston: Boston University Art Gallery, 1984.
Johnson, Ken. “May Stevens.”  New York Times, November 21, 1997
Lippard, Lucy R. From the Center. New York: E.P. Dutton, 1976.
Lippard, Lucy R. “Caring: Five Political Artists.” Studio International [London, England], March 1977.
Lippard, Lucy R. “In Sight, Out of Mind.” Z Magazine, May 1988.
Lippard, Lucy R. “The Politics of Art Criticism.” Maine Times, August 4, 1989.
Mathews, Patricia. “A Dialogue of Silence: May Stevens’ Ordinary/Extraordinary, 1977–1986.” Art Criticism 3, no. 2, Summer 1987.
Mathews, Patricia. “Feminist Art Criticism. ”Art Criticism, vol. 5, no. 2, 1989.
“May Stevens” The New Yorker. February 17 & 24, 2003.
Murdoch, Robert. “May Steven.” ARTnews. October 1999.
Olander, William. One Plus or Minus One. Essays by William Olander and Lucy Lippard. New York: New Museum of Contemporary Art, 1988.
Parker, Rozsika and Griselda Pollock, eds. Framing Feminism: Art and the Women’s Movement 1970-1985. London: Pandora, 1987.
Plagens, Peter. “A Painful War’s Haunted Art.” Newsweek, September 1989.
Pollock, Griselda. “The Politics of Art or an Aesthetic for Women.” FAN 5, [London, England], 1982.
Shapiro, Barbara Stern. May Stevens: Images of Women Near and Far. Boston: Museum of Fine Arts, 1999.
Wallach, Alan. “May Stevens: On the Stage of History.” Arts, November 1978.
Wei, Lilly. “May Stevens at Mary Ryan” Art in America. November 1996.
Withers, Josephine. "Revisioning Our Foremothers: Reflections on the 'Ordinary. Extraordinary' Art of May Stevens." Feminist Studies vol. 13, no. 3 (Autumn 1987), pp. 485–512.
Zimmer, William. “Ten Major Women Artists.” New York Times, March 22, 1987.

External links
Images of Stevens' work at the Mary Ryan Gallery
Oral history interview with May Stevens, circa 1971, Archives of American Art, Smithsonian Institution

1924 births
2019 deaths
American women painters
American feminists
American writers
American women writers
Feminist artists
Artists from Boston
Writers from Quincy, Massachusetts
Massachusetts College of Art and Design alumni
Art Students League of New York alumni
Académie Julian alumni
Radcliffe College alumni
20th-century American painters
20th-century American women artists
21st-century American women artists
Heresies Collective members
21st-century American painters